Three ships of the Royal Navy have borne the name HMS Pellew, after Admiral Sir Edward Pellew, 1st Viscount Exmouth, or his brother, Admiral Sir Israel Pellew. A fourth was planned but renamed before being launched:

  was an  launched in 1916. She was sold in 1921 and broken up in 1923.
 HMS Pellew was to have been a destroyer, ordered in 1942. The order was cancelled and transferred to another shipyard, and she was launched in 1944 as the  destroyer .
  was a  launched in 1954 and sold in 1971.
  was a stone frigate of the Royal Naval Reserve in Exeter.  She was decommissioned in 1994.

See also

References

Royal Navy ship names